Ahmed Elsayed Ali Elsayed Hegazy (born 25 January 1991), simply known as Ahmed Hegazi, is an Egyptian professional footballer who plays as a centre back for Saudi Pro League club Al-Ittihad, and the Egypt national team.

Hegazi has represented the senior Egyptian national team since 2011; during this period, his only absences from the squad have been due to injury. He has represented Egypt in the 2009 FIFA U-20 World Cup, 2011 African U-20 Championship, 2011 FIFA U-20 World Cup, the 2012 Summer Olympics, 2017 Africa Cup of Nations and the 2018 FIFA World Cup. In 2017, he was included in the 2017 Africa Cup of Nations CAF Team of the tournament due to his impressive performances.

Club career

Ismaily
Hegazi's professional playing career began on 24 November 2009, when he made his debut with Egyptian Premier League club Ismaily playing as a full back.

Fiorentina
On 22 December 2011, the Egyptian club announced having made a deal with Italian side Fiorentina in exchange for €1.5 million. The Egyptian company received a 15% sell on fee. Hegazi was given the number 3 shirt at Fiorentina. He made his unofficial debut for the club playing 30 minutes in a friendly against Viareggio.

On 18 November 2012, he played 15 minutes in his official debut against Atalanta and scored his first goal for La Viola later that month in the second half of a Coppa Italia match against Juve Stabia on 28 November. On 12 December, Fiorentina announced that Hegazi had completed surgery after sustaining a severe leg injury in training. The club also announced that he had undergone reconstructive surgery on his anterior cruciate ligament. The expected recovery period before the player could return to sports activity was 5–6 months. In September 2013, he suffered another blow as he injured the same ligament again in training and took him out for six months making him miss most of the season.

On 8 December 2014, Fiorentina announced that the player would be released in January 2015, along with Octávio, Mounir El Hamdaoui, Oleksandr Iakovenko and Joshua Brillante.

Perugia loan
On 2 February 2015, Hegazi joined Serie B side Perugia on loan for the rest of 2014–15 Serie B. He made his debut for the club in a 3–1 loss to Vicenza, playing the whole 90 minutes. It was his first complete match in Italy.

Al Ahly SC
On 1 September 2015, Hegazi joined Egyptian Premier League side Al Ahly of Cairo on a five-year contract.

West Bromwich Albion

On 17 July 2017, Hegazi joined Premier League side West Bromwich Albion on loan from Al Ahly until the end of the 2017–18 season, with Albion holding an option to trigger a permanent transfer. Hegazi made his Premier League debut for West Brom on 12 August, scoring a headed goal in a 1–0 win against AFC Bournemouth and winning the man of the match award. In the following match he received the award for the second time in a row, as West Brom defeated hosts Burnley and made their best start to a top flight campaign since the 1978–79 season.

On 18 December 2017, West Brom exercised the option to sign Hegazi permanently.

In July 2019, after undergoing ankle surgery, it was announced that he would miss the first few weeks of the 2019–20 season.

Al-Ittihad (loan)
On 26 October 2020, Hegazi joined Saudi Pro League club Al-Ittihad on loan from West Bromwich Albion until the end of the 2020–21 season.

International career
Hegazi made his international debut with the senior Egypt national team in an away game against Sierra Leone in 2011 when he was only 20 years and 7 months old.

Ever since he has been a regular on the national team and has only missed games due to injury; in December 2016 Héctor Cúper, the Egypt national football team coach included him in the squad to compete in the 2017 Africa Cup of Nations. Hegazi was a regular in the back four during the tournament, playing every single minute and displaying a solid performance as the Egyptians went all the way to the final. His performance earned him an inclusion in the CAF Team of the tournament.

On 17 November 2020, during the 2021 Africa Cup of Nations qualifiers, Hegazi captained the Egypt national team for the first time, playing 90 minutes in a 1–3 away win against Togo.

Career statistics

Club

International

International goals
As of the match played on 16 October 2018. Egypt's score is listed; first, the score column indicates the score after each Hegazi goal.

Honours
Al Ahly
Egyptian Premier League: 2015–16, 2016–17
Egyptian Super Cup: 2015

Egypt
Africa Cup of Nations runner-up: 2017

Al-Ittihad
Saudi Super Cup: 2022

Individual
Africa Cup of Nations Team of the Tournament: 2017
Saudi Professional League Player of the Month: August 2021

References

External links

 
 
 
 
 

1991 births
Living people
Egyptian footballers
Egyptian expatriate footballers
Egyptian expatriate sportspeople in Italy
Egyptian expatriate sportspeople in England
Egyptian expatriate sportspeople in Saudi Arabia
Ismaily SC players
2011 CAF U-23 Championship players
Egypt international footballers
Olympic footballers of Egypt
Footballers at the 2012 Summer Olympics
Serie A players
ACF Fiorentina players
Expatriate footballers in England
Expatriate footballers in Italy
Expatriate footballers in Saudi Arabia
A.C. Perugia Calcio players
Serie B players
Al Ahly SC players
2017 Africa Cup of Nations players
2018 FIFA World Cup players
2019 Africa Cup of Nations players
Footballers at the 2020 Summer Olympics
2021 Africa Cup of Nations players
West Bromwich Albion F.C. players
Egyptian Premier League players
Premier League players
Saudi Professional League players
Ittihad FC players
People from Ismailia
Association football central defenders
English Football League players